Legislative Assembly elections were held in Uttarakhand on 14 February 2022 to elect 70 members of the Uttarakhand Legislative Assembly. The votes were counted and the results were declared on 10 March 2022.

Background
The tenure of Uttarakhand Legislative Assembly is scheduled to end on 23 March 2022. The previous assembly elections were held in February 2017. After the election, Bharatiya Janata Party formed the state government, with Trivendra Singh Rawat becoming Chief Minister.

Political developments
Amidst the internal turmoil in the BJP Uttarakhand unit and the mounting pressure of BJP MLAs against himself, Chief Minister Trivendra Singh Rawat resigned on 9 March 2021. Tirath Singh Rawat was sworn in as the new Chief Minister of the state on 10 March 2021.

On 2 July 2021, Tirath Singh Rawat resigned from the Chief Minister's post to avoid constitutional crisis in the state. On 3 July 2021, Pushkar Singh Dhami was sworn-in as the 10th Chief Minister of Uttarakhand, assuming office on 4 July 2021.

In January 2021, Arvind Kejriwal announced that Aam Aadmi Party (AAP) would be contesting in six state elections in 2022 including Uttarakhand. On 17 August 2021, AAP declared Ajay Kothiyal as their Chief Ministerial candidate for the assembly election.

Election schedule 
The election schedule was announced by the Election Commission of India on 8 January 2022.

Parties and alliances









Others

Candidates

Party manifestos

AAP
AAP asked the residents of Uttarakhand for suggestions for manifesto and received 71,249 replies. In addition to a main manifesto, the party will be releasing separate manifesto for each constituency.
On 6 February, AAP national convener Arvind Kejriwal announced his party's 10-point manifesto for Uttarakhand if the AAP wins the election and forms the government.
End corruption
24x7 electricity, free electricity upto 300 units
Employment
₹1000/month for women
Education revolution, improvement of government schools.
Healthcare revolution, improvement in health facilities and building Mohalla Clinics in every village.
Revamp roads and build roads to every village
Pilgrimage (Teerth Yatra) to the elderly
Making Uttarakhand the spiritual capital for Hindus.
Govt job for retired soldiers and amount of ₹1 crore paid ex-gratia to family of soldiers after death

BJP
The Bharatiya Janata Party (BJP) has issued the manifesto for the public. Union Minister Nitin Gadkari has released the manifesto known as the "drishti patra" in a conference .

key points of the manifesto:-
 Help will be given to ex-servicemen to settle in the border areas.
 45 new tourism spots will be developed.
 Rs 6000 from central and Rs 6000 from state government will be given under Kisan Samman Nidhi.
 3 cylinders free of cost to poor houses in a year.
 Apart from this, Rs 2000 per month will be given to women of BPL family, Rs 1000 per month to poor children.  
 50000 government jobs will be given out of which, 24000 jobs will be given as soon as they return to power.
 The Chief Minister Trainee Scheme will be started for the unemployed. Under this, unemployed youth will be given Rs 3000 every month for a year. This will be in addition to the amount received from the Center.
 Trees will not be cut, they will be transplanted.
 The youth of Uttarakhand will be given training in tree plantation.
 Laborers and the poor will be provided with a pension of up to Rs 6,000 and an insurance cover of Rs 5 lakh.
 Jan Aushadhi Kendras will be increased from 190 to 400.
 Mobile hospitals will be developed in every area. 
 Medical colleges will be developed in every district. 
 Promise to give Rs 3000 every month to the women head of BPL families.
 party promised a stricter law on ‘love jihad’ and “necessary measures to stop the demographic changes in Uttarakhand” if voted back to power. “We aim to make the ‘love jihad’ law stricter with a provision of 10-years of rigorous imprisonment,” said Ramesh Pokhriyal Nishank, former Union minister and chairman of the manifesto committee. 
 Annual payment of Rs 2,000 to farmers in addition to the amount they get under the Prime Minister Kisan Samman Nidhi scheme.The additional Rs 2,000 would be given to farmers under the Chief Minister Kisan Protsahan Yojana, as per the poll document.
 We will complete the Char Dham all-weather road project by the end of this year and launch seven ropeway projects, including one in Kedarnath and another in Hemkund Sahib.~Gadkari
 Give an aid of Rs 40,000 to expectant mothers living in hilly areas and increase the pension amount of senior citizens from Rs 1,400 to Rs 3,600.
 We are also going to connect all the villages in Uttarakhand with 4G/5G mobile network and high-speed broadband internet. 
 To improve transport services, we will also procure 1,000 electric buses,” said chief minister Puskhar Dhami.
 To ex-servicemen voters, the BJP has proposed to start a credit guarantee fund trust in the name of late CDS General Bipin Rawat. The beneficiaries will get a 50% guarantee cover for credit of up to Rs 5 lakh.
 BJP manifesto promises the setting up of medical colleges in each district and establishing a satellite centre of AIIMS Rishikesh in the Kumaon region.
 setting up a special fund of Rs 1,000 crore to establish 50 modern farm storage and cold storage facilities, giving a subsidy of Rs 10,000 to the elderly for pilgrimage, developing five hill stations on the lines of Mussoorie and Nainital, and setting up of an eco-tourism promotion board and an adventure tourism promotion board, among others.

INC 
INC released its manifesto on 2 February 2022 titled 'Uttarakhand Swabhiman Pratigya Patra'. Earlier on 24 January 2022 the party launched its campaign for Uttarakhand with the tagline “Char Dham, Char Kaam”. The four "kaam" (promises) made in the manifesto are

 Capping the price of a gas cylinder for consumers at ₹500
 Income support of ₹40,000 annually for the poorest five lakh families
 Doorstep Medical service under ‘Health facilities Har Gaon Har Dwar’ initiative
 Ensuring employment opportunities to 4 lakh youth
 Free travel for women in state transport
 Filling up 57,000 vacancies in various government departments within a year of voting to power
 Setting up of the state’s “first sports university”
 Withdrawing cases against farmers filed during protests against the now-repealed farm laws
 Modernise sugar mills and improve the mechanism of payment to the sugarcane farmers
 Comprehensive educational framework with increased budget allocation
 Resume “Mere Bujurg Mere Teerth” (my elders my pilgrimage) along with pension to the senior citizens

Campaigns
Samyukt Kisan Morcha (SKM), the umbrella body of farmers, campaigned against the ruling BJP by organizing public meetings and rallies asking farmers to not vote for BJP. SKM had organised the 2020–2021 Indian farmers' protest against the controversial three farm acts which were passed by the BJP-led Union Government in the BJP controlled Parliament of India in September 2020. These laws were eventually withdrawn by the Union government.

On 31 January 2022, the farmer leaders observed "Vishwasghat Diwas" (treachery day) across India after the Union government failed to fulfill promises that were made to the farmers during the withdrawal of agitation against three farm laws. SKM leaders have warned that the farm laws may be re-introduced if BJP wins the elections.

SKM leaders launched "Mission UP and Uttarakhand" and appealed to the voters to not vote for BJP calling them "anti-farmer". The appeal did not suggest to vote for any political party. SKM's appeal was supported by 57 farmer organisations. The campaign rallies were banned due to Covid-19, so pandemic leaflets with the appeal were handed to the villagers.

Policy positions

Farm Laws
BJP's Union Agriculture Minister Narendra Singh Tomar in December 2021, had said that BJP brought the 3 agriculture amendment laws (repealed in 2021). "But the government is not disappointed. We moved a step back and we will move forward again because farmers are India’s backbone."

The INC and AAP are against the farm laws and had supported the farmers' unions during their year-long protest against the farm laws.

Poll prediction

Opinion polls

Exit polls 

The Election Commission banned the media from publishing exit polls between 7 AM on 10 February 2022 and 6:30 PM on 7 March 2022. Violation of the directive would be punishable with two years of imprisonment. Accordingly the exit polls below were published in the evening of 7 March.

Voter turnout 

Source:

Results

Results by alliance and party

Results by division

Results by district

Results by constituency

See also

5th Uttarakhand Assembly
Second Dhami ministry
Elections in Uttarakhand
Politics of Uttarakhand
2022 elections in India

References

External links 
 Election Commission of Indian Candidate List

State Assembly elections in Uttarakhand
Uttarakhand